Carnsmerry is a hamlet in Cornwall, England. Carnsmerry is in the civil parish of Treverbyn.

References

Hamlets in Cornwall